The 2009 GFA League First Division season was the 41st of the amateur competition of the first-tier football in the Gambia.  The competition was governed by the Gambian Football Association (GFA) .  The season began on February 20 and finished earlier on May 23. The (Gambian) Armed Forces FC won the second title after finishing with 44 points and qualified into the 2010 CAF Champions League the following season. Wallidan FC was also winner of the 2009 Gambian Cup, runner up was Samger, not even that club qualified and competed in the 2010 CAF Confederation Cup due to financial problems.  It was the first season featuring twelve clubs, up from ten last season.  The last two positions received relegation into the GFA League Second Division in the following season, they were Africell and Tallinding United.

Overview
The season featured a total of 132 matches and scored a total of 228 goals, more than last season.

Real de Banjul was again the defending team of the title. 25 goals were the highest scored both by the Armed Forces and 10th placed Brikama which had a club scored the most that was above the relegation zone, fourth was 22 goals scored by Bakau United, fourth place.

Four clubs finished with 31 points and were fourth place Bakau United, Hawks, Gamtel and seventh placed Samger, the only difference was Bakau scored 22 goals, Hawks and Gamtel had 17 goals, Hawks conceded 13 and Gamtel conceded 16 and Samger scored 16 goals.  Also Hawks, Gamtel and Samger had 8 wins and 7 draws.

Participating clubs

 Wallidan FC
 Steve Biko FC
 Real de Banjul
 Sea View FC
 Samger FC
 Africell FC - Promoted from the Second Division

 Hawks FC
 Gambia Ports Authority FC
 Armed Forces FC
 Bakau United
 Sait Matty FC
 Gamtel FC
 Tallinding United - Promoted from the Second Division

League standings

See also
GFA League First Division

Footnotes

External links
Historic results at rsssf.com

Gambia
Gambia
GFA League First Division seasons
First